Dzhurynskyi or the Chervonohorodskyi waterfall is located on the Dzhuryn river in Nyrkiv village,  Chortkiv Raion,  Ternopil Oblast of western Ukraine Waterfall is  high and  wide .

This is the most powerful waterfall in Ukraine. Dzhurynskyi Canyon, which is home Dzhurynskyi Fall, is a local natural landmark.

See also
 Waterfalls of Ukraine

External links
 www.turystam.in.ua

References 

Waterfalls of Ukraine